Monosodium phosphate (MSP), also known as monobasic sodium phosphate and sodium dihydrogen phosphate, is an inorganic compound of sodium with a dihydrogen phosphate (H2PO4−) anion. One of many sodium phosphates, it is a common industrial chemical. The salt exists in an anhydrous form, as well as mono- and dihydrates.

Production and reactions
The salt is obtained by partial neutralization of phosphoric acid. The pKa of monosodium phosphate is 6.8-7.2 (depending on the physicochemical characteristics during pKa determination). 

Heating this salt above 169 °C gives the corresponding sodium acid pyrophosphate:
2 NaH2PO4   →   Na2H2P2O7  +  H2O

When heated at 550 °C, anhydrous trisodium trimetaphosphate results:

Uses
Phosphates are often used in foods and in water treatment.  The pH of such formulations is generally adjusted by mixtures of various sodium phosphates, such as this salt.
The sodium chloride equivalent value, or E-Value, is 0.49. It is soluble in 4.5 parts water.

Food additive
It is added in animal feed, toothpaste, and evaporated milk. It is used as a thickening agent and emulsifier.

Detection of magnesium
Monosodium phosphate is used to detect the presence of magnesium ions in salts. Formation of a white precipitate on the addition of ammonium chloride, ammonium hydroxide and monosodium phosphate to an aqueous or dilute HCl solution of the salt indicates presence of magnesium ions.

Notes

Phosphates
Sodium compounds
Edible thickening agents